The Open European Mahjong Championship (OEMC) is the oldest European competition of Mahjong organized by European Mahjong Association (EMA) under Mahjong Competition Rules (MCR). Both men and women are eligible to contest this title, and the championship holds both the individual event and team event. It was established in 2005 and has since then taken place on two-yearly basis. As this championship is an open competition, any non-European players may participate.

History
After a few months later of the first world championship was held in Tokyo, 2002, Martin Rep, a Dutch Mahjong Player, decided to establish European organizations for Mahjong.

On June 25, 2005, he promoted the first European Championship and also hold the General Assembly in Netherlands in Nijmegen, Netherlands. During this Assembly, EMA was established. Masato Chiba, from Japan, won the first championship.

On June 21, 2007, the 2nd European championship was held in Copenhagen, Denmark for 3 days. Martin Wedel Jacobsen from Denmark won the championship. Team event was begun since this championship.
In 2008, EMA began another European Mahjong Championship under Japanese Riichi rule.

On July 11, 2011, Ildikó Hargitai became the first female mahjong player who won the European championship, and "French Team no1" from France won the team division.

Champions

Individual

Team

Venues

See also
World Mahjong Championship(World competition under same rules)
European Mahjong Association(EMA)
European Riichi Championship (Another European Championship held by EMA)
Mahjong Competition Rules(Official rules)

References

External links
OEMC 2011 Official Site
OEMC 2009 Official Site
OEMC 2007 Official Site
European Mahjong Association
EMA Official Competition rule

European mahjong championships